Robert Spear or Bob Spear may refer to:

Robert Spear Hudson (1812–1884), English businessman
Bob Spear (basketball) (1918–1995), American Air Force basketball coach
Bob Spear (naturalist) (1920–2014), American naturalist
Robert J. Spear, American luthier

See also
Robert Spears (disambiguation)